Redwall is a television series made by Canada-based Nelvana and France-based Alphanim and is based on the Redwall novels by Brian Jacques. The series spans three seasons, the first based on the first book Redwall, the second on Mattimeo and the third on Martin the Warrior. There are 39 episodes in total.

Series overview

Episodes

Season 1: Redwall (1999)
This is the only season to use cel animation.

Season 2: Mattimeo (2000–01)
This is the first season to use digital ink-and-paint animation.

Season 3: Martin the Warrior (2001–02)
This is the last season to use digital ink-and-paint animation.

References

External links

Redwall
Redwall
Redwall
Redwall